The 1908–09 Irish Cup was the 29th edition of the premier knock-out cup competition in Irish football. 

Cliftonville won the tournament for the 7th time, defeating Bohemians 2–1 in the final replay, after a 0–0 draw in the original final.

Results

First round

|}

Replays

|}

Quarter-finals

|}

Replays

|}

Semi-finals

|}

1 A replay was ordered after a protest.

Replay

|}

1 A replay was ordered after a protest.

Second Replay

|}

Final

Replay

References

External links
 Northern Ireland Cup Finals. Rec.Sport.Soccer Statistics Foundation (RSSSF)

Irish Cup seasons
1908–09 domestic association football cups
1908–09 in Irish association football